Brennan Newberry (born February 9, 1990) is an American professional stock car racing driver.

Racing career
Newberry began his racing career in go-karts in 2000; later moving to full-bodied stock cars, he competed in the SRL Southwest Tour in 2007, then moved to USAC competition in 2008, racing in the Ford Focus Midget Car Series; he scored one win during the 2008 season, ending the year fourth in series points. In 2009 he returned to the Southwest Tour before moving to NASCAR competition in 2010, racing in the Toyota All-Star Showdown before running a limited schedule over the following three years in the K&N Pro Series West, scoring two poles in five races run in 2011. He finished 23rd in points that season, his best in the series.

After failing to qualify for the season-ending race of 2011, Newberry made his debut in the Camping World Truck Series in 2012, driving for his family-owned NTS Motorsports team in ten races starting at Martinsville Speedway; he posted a best finish of 19th at Michigan International Speedway, ending the year 31st in series points.

For 2013, NTS Motorsports merged with Joe Dennette Motorsports, planning to run Newberry full-time in the Camping World Truck Series as a teammate to Ron Hornaday Jr., with veteran Eddie Pardue serving as crew chief. Competing for Rookie of the Year, he won the pole for the first race of the season at Daytona International Speedway. In July, Newberry won a last-chance qualifying race at Eldora Speedway for the Mudsummer Classic, before scoring his first career top-10 finish in the series at Pocono Raceway in August. At Chicagoland Speedway in September, Newberry was forced to sit out the race due to illness, with Austin Dillon substituting. Dillon was able to finish 7th in the race; Newberry had never scored that good of a finish in his career in any race, despite driving the same equipment.

In 2014, Newberry stepped back to run full-time in the K&N Pro Series East as a teammate to Gray Gaulding, in addition to running selected Truck Series races. On July 9, it was announced that Newberry made his Nationwide Series debut in the No. 55 Qore-24 Chevrolet Camaro for NTS Motorsports & SS-Green Light Racing in the Sta-Green 200 at New Hampshire Motor Speedway, finishing 25th. Newberry ran the #55 in two more races, finishing 19th at Watkins Glen and 23rd at Chicago. Newberry and NTS/SS-Green Light ran a fourth race at Newberry's favorite track Phoenix International Raceway in a No. 77 car, finishing 36th after an early crash.

Personal life
The son of former Funny Car driver and current car owner Bob Newberry, Newberry is a graduate of Bakersfield College.

Motorsports career results

NASCAR
(key) (Bold – Pole position awarded by qualifying time. Italics – Pole position earned by points standings or practice time. * – Most laps led.)

Nationwide Series

Camping World Truck Series

K&N Pro Series East

K&N Pro Series West

 Season still in progress
 Ineligible for series points

ARCA Racing Series
(key) (Bold – Pole position awarded by qualifying time. Italics – Pole position earned by points standings or practice time. * – Most laps led.)

References

External links

Living people
1990 births
Racing drivers from Bakersfield, California
NASCAR drivers
Bakersfield College alumni
ARCA Menards Series drivers